The following is a partial list of the "D" codes for Medical Subject Headings (MeSH), as defined by the United States National Library of Medicine (NLM).

This list covers intracellular signaling peptides and proteins. For other protein-related codes, see List of MeSH codes (D12.776).

Codes before these are found at List of MeSH codes (D12.776) § MeSH D12.776.467.984.750. Codes following these are found at List of MeSH codes (D12.776) § MeSH D12.776.486. For other MeSH codes, see List of MeSH codes.

The source for this content is the set of 2006 MeSH Trees from the NLM.

– intracellular signaling peptides and proteins

– activating transcription factor 6

– adaptor proteins, signal transducing

– caveolin 1

– caveolin 2

– cortactin

– crk-associated substrate protein

– grb2 adaptor protein

– grb7 adaptor protein

– grb10 adaptor protein

– interferon-stimulated gene factor 3
 – interferon-stimulated gene factor 3, alpha subunit
 – stat1 transcription factor
 – stat2 transcription factor
 – interferon-stimulated gene factor 3, gamma subunit

– interferon regulatory factors
 – interferon regulatory factor-1
 – interferon regulatory factor-2
 – interferon regulatory factor-3
 – interferon regulatory factor-7
 – interferon-stimulated gene factor 3, gamma subunit

– pii nitrogen regulatory proteins

– paxillin

– protein inhibitors of activated stat

– 14-3-3 proteins

– proto-oncogene proteins c-crk

– proto-oncogene proteins c-vav

– smad proteins
 – smad proteins, inhibitory
 – smad6 protein
 – smad7 protein
 – smad proteins, receptor-regulated
 – smad1 protein
 – smad2 protein
 – smad3 protein
 – smad5 protein
 – smad8 protein
 – smad4 protein

– stat transcription factors
 – stat1 transcription factor
 – stat2 transcription factor
 – stat3 transcription factor
 – stat4 transcription factor
 – stat5 transcription factor
 – stat6 transcription factor

– suppressor of cytokine signaling proteins

– tumor necrosis factor receptor-associated peptides and proteins
 – tnf receptor-associated factor 1
 – tnf receptor-associated factor 2
 – tnf receptor-associated factor 3
 – tnf receptor-associated factor 5
 – tnf receptor-associated factor 6

– adenylate cyclase

– apoptosis regulatory proteins

– apoptosis inducing factor

– caspases
 – caspase 1

– inhibitor of apoptosis proteins
 – neuronal apoptosis-inhibitory protein
 – x-linked inhibitor of apoptosis protein

– proto-oncogene proteins c-bcl-2
 – bcl-associated death protein
 – bcl-2-associated x protein
 – bcl-2 homologous antagonist-killer protein
 – bcl-x protein
 – bh3 interacting domain death agonist protein

– ca(2+)-calmodulin dependent protein kinase

– myosin-light-chain kinase

– casein kinases

– casein kinase i
 – casein kinase ialpha
 – casein kinase idelta
 – casein kinase iepsilon

– casein kinase ii

– cyclic nucleotide-regulated protein kinases

– cyclic amp-dependent protein kinases
 – beta-adrenergic receptor kinase

– cyclic gmp-dependent protein kinases

– protamine kinase

– cyclin-dependent kinases

– cdc2-cdc28 kinases
 – cdc2 protein kinase
 – cdc28 protein kinase, s cerevisiae
 – cyclin-dependent kinase 5
 – cyclin-dependent kinase 9

– cyclin-dependent kinase 2

– cyclin-dependent kinase 4

– cyclin-dependent kinase 6

– maturation-promoting factor
 – cdc2 protein kinase

– eif-2 kinase

– focal adhesion protein-tyrosine kinases

– glycogen synthase kinases

– glycogen synthase kinase 3

– gtp-binding protein regulators

– gtpase-activating proteins
 – chimerin proteins
 – chimerin 1
 – eukaryotic initiation factor-5
 – ras gtpase-activating proteins
 – neurofibromin 1
 – p120 gtpase activating protein
 – rgs proteins

– guanine nucleotide dissociation inhibitors

– guanine nucleotide exchange factors
 – eukaryotic initiation factor-2b
 – guanine nucleotide-releasing factor 2
 – proto-oncogene proteins c-vav
 – ral guanine nucleotide exchange factor
 – ras guanine nucleotide exchange factors
 – ras-grf1
 – son of sevenless proteins
 – son of sevenless protein, drosophila
 – sos1 protein

– guanylate cyclase

– heterotrimeric gtp-binding proteins

– gtp-binding protein alpha subunits
 – gtp-binding protein alpha subunits, g12-g13
 – gtp-binding protein alpha subunits, gi-go
 – gtp-binding protein alpha subunit, gi2
 – gtp-binding protein alpha subunits, gq-g11
 – gtp-binding protein alpha subunits, gs

– gtp-binding protein beta subunits

– gtp-binding protein gamma subunits

– transducin

– i-kappa b kinase

– i-kappa b proteins

– intracellular calcium-sensing proteins

– calmodulin

– calnexin

– calreticulin

– gelsolin

– neuronal calcium-sensor proteins
 – guanylate cyclase-activating proteins
 – hippocalcin
 – Kv channel-interacting proteins
 – neurocalcin
 – recoverin

– map kinase kinase kinases

– map kinase kinase kinase 1

– map kinase kinase kinase 2

– map kinase kinase kinase 3

– map kinase kinase kinase 4

– map kinase kinase kinase 5

– proto-oncogene proteins c-mos

– raf kinases
 – oncogene proteins v-raf
 – proto-oncogene proteins a-raf
 – proto-oncogene proteins b-raf
 – proto-oncogene proteins c-raf

– mitogen-activated protein kinase kinases

– map kinase kinase 1

– map kinase kinase 2

– map kinase kinase 3

– map kinase kinase 4

– map kinase kinase 5

– map kinase kinase 6

– map kinase kinase 7

– mitogen-activated protein kinases

– extracellular signal-regulated map kinases
 – mitogen-activated protein kinase 1
 – mitogen-activated protein kinase 3
 – mitogen-activated protein kinase 6
 – mitogen-activated protein kinase 7

– jnk mitogen-activated protein kinases
 – mitogen-activated protein kinase 8
 – mitogen-activated protein kinase 9
 – mitogen-activated protein kinase 10

– p38 mitogen-activated protein kinases

– monomeric gtp-binding proteins

– adp-ribosylation factors
 – adp-ribosylation factor 1

– rab gtp-binding proteins
 – rab1 gtp-binding proteins
 – rab2 gtp-binding protein
 – rab3 gtp-binding proteins
 – rab3a gtp-binding protein
 – rab4 gtp-binding proteins
 – rab5 gtp-binding proteins

– ral gtp-binding proteins

– ran gtp-binding protein

– rap gtp-binding proteins
 – rap1 gtp-binding proteins

– ras proteins
 – oncogene protein p21(ras)
 – proto-oncogene proteins p21(ras)

– rho gtp-binding proteins
 – cdc42 gtp-binding protein
 – cdc42 gtp-binding protein in saccharomyces cerevisiae
 – rac gtp-binding proteins
 – rac1 gtp-binding protein
 – rhoa gtp-binding protein
 – rhob gtp-binding protein

– olfactory marker protein

– phosphatidylethanolamine binding protein

– phospholipase c gamma

– proto-oncogene proteins c-akt

– proto-oncogene proteins c-fyn

– pten phosphohydrolase

– ribosomal protein s6 kinases

– ribosomal protein s6 kinases, 70-kda

– ribosomal protein s6 kinases, 90-kda

The list continues at List of MeSH codes (D12.776) § MeSH D12.776.486.

D12.776.476